Inspector Gadget's Field Trip (onscreen title: Field Trip Starring Inspector Gadget) is an American children's television series that is a spin-off incarnation of Inspector Gadget, produced by DIC Productions, L.P. in 1996. The series originally aired on The History Channel as one of only two DIC shows produced for the channel (Gadget Boy's Adventures in History was the other one and ran concurrently with Field Trip) in the United States.

Concept
The series was an educational travelogue program for children, in which the animated Gadget would show viewers the many different sites in famous places around the world via live-action-clips with historical facts. The theme song is slightly similar to the one in the Gadget Boy series; in fact, Gadget Boy himself made a cameo appearance in one episode.

Gadget was the only main character to appear in this series; others such as Penny, Brain, Chief Quimby (although mentioned by Gadget in some episodes), Capeman, Dr. Claw, M.A.D. Cat and the M.A.D. Agents were absent. Don Adams reprised the role of Gadget in this series.

Broadcast
Two seasons consisting of a total of 22 episodes were aired, ending in 1998, where the show continued in reruns on The History Channel until 2000. In 2001, the show began airing reruns in syndication in order to fill respective station's E/I guidelines, and later aired as part of the E/I DIC Kids Network syndicated block from September 2004 until 2006. Comedian Don Adams returns as the voice of Inspector Gadget (this would be his final appearance as that character; he was concurrently voicing the title character of Gadget Boy).

A Spanish-dubbed version aired on Univision's Planeta U block on Saturday mornings as Los Viajes de Inspector Gadget from the block's premiere from April 5, 2008 to May 29, 2010 when it was taken off the lineup. During the opening sequence, an image of the Temple of Saturn in the ancient forum in Rome, Italy, is presented with the label of "Greece."

The show available to stream on Paramount+ (formerly CBS All Access).

Episode list

Season 1 (1996)

Season 2 (1997–98)

Home media
In June 1996, DIC appointed Buena Vista Home Video as the home video distributor for the series. Buena Vista, through subsidiary Disney Educational Productions. released various VHS tapes of the series with 2 episodes on each, which were sold as educational products for places like schools. The company would re-release the series on DVD in 2007, with the episodes varying between each DVD.

Anchor Bay UK released 2 volumes in 2004 and 2006 for public usage, each containing 4 episodes. Avenue Entertainment would release 2 volumes in 2004, with these ones containing 2 episodes each.

References

External links
 

1996 American television series debuts
1998 American television series endings
History (American TV channel) original programming
1990s American children's comedy television series
American children's education television series
American television series with live action and animation
American television spin-offs
English-language television shows
Inspector Gadget
Television series by DIC Entertainment
Cyborgs in television